Asprokampos is a village in the municipality of Sikyona, Corinthia, Greece. It is 8 km northeast of Lake Stymphalia, 11 km northwest of Nemea and 22 km southwest of Kiato. The village has about 210 inhabitants and is located at an altitude of 750 meters.

References

Populated places in Corinthia